Sołonka  is a village in the administrative district of Gmina Lubenia, within Rzeszów County, Subcarpathian Voivodeship, in south-eastern Poland.

The village has a population of 478.

Tourist attractions
Remains of a salt mine were discovered in Sołonka which was believed to be used during the pre-Slavonic times and was very likely used in the Middle Ages. In the Middle Ages, there was a trade route from Hungary towards Sandomierz, this route was called the royal route. In the Roman period, amber routes led to Sołonka in the 4th-5th century CE. In the years 2009 - 2010 a salt cascade was built.

Gallery

References

Villages in Rzeszów County